All Saints Greek Orthodox Grammar School, or simply All Saints Grammar (ASG), is a dual-campus independent Greek Orthodox co-educational early learning, primary, and secondary day school, located in south-western Sydney, New South Wales, Australia.

Established in 1990, the school's Junior campus for early learning to Year 6 is located in Belmore, and the Senior High School "Towers Campus" for students in Year 7 to 12 is located in Belmore South. The school has a non-selective enrolment policy, and, as of 2008, catered for approximately 700 students from early learning to Year 12.

See also 

 List of non-government schools in New South Wales
 Education in Australia

References

External links
All Saints Grammar Official Website

Greek-Australian culture in Sydney
Private primary schools in Sydney
Private secondary schools in Sydney
Eastern Orthodox schools in Australia
Educational institutions established in 1990
1990 establishments in Australia